John Tennent or Tennand of Listonshiels (died c. 1549) was a servant and companion of King James V of Scotland. He kept an account of the king's daily expenses which is an important source document for the Scottish royal court.

Life at court
Tennent's court positions were pursemaster and yeoman of the wardrobe. He was given livery clothes as a servant in the king's chamber in 1529. As pursemaster he daily accompanied the king, paying his small debts and handing over the sums the king gave in alms or as tips to workmen and beggars. He and the other pursemasters were given money for the king's purse by the Treasurer of Scotland.

Tennent's other main rôle was yeoman and master of the wardrobe. The wardrobe was a large establishment which employed almost 40 individuals over the personal reign. There were embroiderers, tailors, a laundry, tapestry men, and carts to transport the clothes, tapestries, and cloths-of-estate between the palaces. Tennent took delivery of linen for bed sheets, the king's shirts, and night caps. He bought canvas to hang around the king's gowns in the wardrobe.

Tennent was in charge of the Honours of Scotland and ordered a new case to be made for a sword in March 1539. This may have been the sword sent by Pope Paul III in 1537, which is now lost. 

James V and Mary of Guise went hunting in Glenartney and Glen Finglas in September 1539. Tennent hired men and horses from Dunblane to bring their bedding from Stirling.

At St Andrews, on 19 May 1540, James V gave 44 shillings to two Dutchmen who played and danced for him on the shore. James twice paid out for farm animals killed by accident with a culverin, a new portable gun. Tennent was also yeoman of the crossbow. He was appointed keeper of the palace and park of Holyroodhouse in November 1540.

France
When James V went to France in 1536, he first met a prospective bride, Marie de Vendôme, daughter of Charles, Duke of Vendôme, at St. Quentin in Picardy. It is said that at their meeting James instructed Tennent to pretend to be him and they exchanged clothes. This story appears in four sixteenth century chronicles. Adam Abell and George Buchanan mention the disguise; only John Lesley names Tennent; Lindsay of Pitscottie's version is the most elaborate but does not identify the servant. As Lesley's translator put it;"he takis on the habit of his servand and cumis to the place quhair sche was, for he finyet himselfe Johne Tennantis servand, quhom in this iornay the king with him had his servand." Tennent was on the French trip, and his one diplomatic errand was not a success. James sent him from Compiegne with letters and a verbal messages for Henry VIII of England and Cromwell on 24 February 1537. Margaret Tudor complained that he was not well received. She wrote to her brother, Henry VIII;"plesit Zoure Grace to wit, thare is in this realme ane grete wourde that thare wes ane servand of the King my sonnis come to Zoure Grace, quhome thai call Johnne Tennand, quha wes not wele tane with, as thai say." James came back from France with Madeleine of Valois as his queen: Tennent brought their trunks from Leith to Holyroodhouse.

Death of James V
When James V went to hunt at Cramalt Tower in Meggetland in September 1538 Tennent brought bedding from Linlithgow Palace and the wardrobe servant Malcolm Gourlay brought tents stored at Holyrood Palace for his company.

Tennent was a signatory to the instrument made at Falkland Palace at the king's deathbed which David Beaton used to attempt to claim the regency. After the death of James V, John Tennent carried out the instructions of Regent Arran and Cardinal Beaton, and dispersed numerous items from the king's wardrobe and armoury to their favourites. A record of these gifts survives in the British Library. The king's former lawyer, Adam Otterburn received a gift of armour on 22 December by the order of Cardinal Beaton, including a "secret courage", a helmet covered with corduroy, a "Jack of plate", two rapiers and other items.

Marriage and family
John Tennent married Mause Atkinson (Mavis or Marion Acheson) who had been the king's laundress since 1516. The household books record barrels of soap delivered to her for washing table linen. She also made linen items, like nightcaps, for the king.

His property, Listonshiels was in the parish of Kirkliston. It belonged to Torphichen Preceptory and as a reward for his services, John paid a reduced feudal rent; "listonschelis, set to iohne tennent be the kingis command in feu for £6 of maile allanerlie", £6 rent only. Another servant, Robert Hamilton, enjoyed a similar privilege at Briggis.

John and Mause had no surviving children, and Listonshiels passed to John's brother Patrick Tennent by 1549. Patrick Tennent was married to Elizabeth Hoppar, whose sister Katrine Hoppar was married to the Edinburgh merchant Andrew Moubray (III) who built Moubray House in Edinburgh.

References

Further reading 
 Harrison, John G., Wardrobe Inventories of James V: British Library MS Royal 18 C (Historic Scotland: Edinburgh, 2008)
 Murray, Athol L., 'Pursemaster's Accounts', Miscellany of the Scottish History Society, vol. 10 (Edinburgh, 1965), pp. 13–51.
 Thomas, Andrea, Princelie Majestie, the court of James V (John Donald: Edinburgh, 2005)

16th-century Scottish people
Scottish diplomats
British and English royal favourites
Court of James V of Scotland
1540s deaths
Year of birth unknown
16th-century diplomats
Monarchy and money